A Diamond in the Mind: Live 2011 is a concert film and live album by British pop band Duran Duran. It was filmed at the Manchester Arena in Manchester, England, Great Britain on 16 December 2011 during the All You Need Is Now Tour and released on 2 July 2012 Blu-ray, DVD and CD and on Handcrafted Limited Edition Double LP Vinyl of 2000 copies released through The Vinyl Factory.

Track list

 "Return To Now" (Intro)
 "Before the Rain"
 "Planet Earth"
 "A View to a Kill"
 "All You Need Is Now"
 "Blame the Machines"
 "Safe (In the Heat of the Moment)"
 "The Reflex"
 "The Man Who Stole A Leopard"
 "Girl Panic!"
 "White Lines (Don't Do It)"
 "Careless Memories"
 "Ordinary World"
 "Notorious"
 "Hungry Like the Wolf"
 "(Reach Up for The) Sunrise"
 "The Wild Boys"/"Relax"
 "Rio"
 "A Diamond in the Mind" (credits)

Bonus features

 Duran Duran 2011 (Documentary)
 "Come Undone"
 "Is There Something I Should Know?"
 "Tiger Tiger" (Exclusive to the Japanese releases)

Album
"Before the Rain"
"Planet Earth"
"A View to a Kill"
"All You Need Is Now"
"Come Undone"
"Blame the Machines"
"The Reflex"
"Girl Panic!"
"Is There Something I Should Know?"
"Ordinary World"
"Notorious"
"Hungry Like the Wolf"
"(Reach Up for The) Sunrise"
"The Wild Boys"/"Relax"
"Rio"

Musicians

Duran Duran
Simon Le Bon - lead vocals
John Taylor - bass, backing vocals
Nick Rhodes - keyboards, backing vocals
Roger Taylor - drums

Additional
Dom Brown - guitar, backing vocals
Simon Willescroft - saxophone, keyboards
Anna Ross - backing vocals, duet vocals (Safe (In the Heat of the Moment), The Man Who Stole A Leopard and Come Undone) 
Dawne Adams - percussion

References 

Duran Duran video albums
Live video albums
2012 live albums
2012 video albums
Eagle Records video albums
Eagle Records live albums